Cormohipparion is an extinct genus of horse belonging to the tribe Hipparionini that lived in North America during the late Miocene to Pliocene (Hemphillian to Blancan in the NALMA classification).

Taxonomy 

The genus Cormohipparion was coined for the extinct hipparionin horse "Equus" occidentale, described by Joseph Leidy in 1856. However it was soon argued that the partial material fell within the range of morphological variation seen in Hipparion, and that the members of Cormohipparion belonged instead within Hipparion.  This rested on claims that pre-orbital morphology did not have any taxonomic significance, a claim that detailed study of quarry sections later showed to be false. The genus was originally identified by a closed off preorbital fossa, but later examinations of the cheek teeth, specifically the lower cheek teeth, of Cormohipparion specimens found that they were indeed valid and distinct from Hipparion.  A reappraisal of many horse genera was thus conducted in 1984, and the proposed synonymy was not acknowledged by later literature. C. ingenuum holds the distinction for being the first prehistoric horse to be described in Florida, as well as being one of the most common species of extinct species three-toed horses found to be in Florida. Cormohipparion emsliei has the distinction of being the last hipparion horse known from the fossil record.

The genus is considered to represent an ancestor to Hippotherium. Its fossils have been recovered from as far south as Mexico. Fossils have been found in the Great Plains and Rio Grande regions of North America, Mexico, Florida and Texas, which shows that they were herding animals.

References 

Miocene horses
Pliocene horses
Zanclean genera
Messinian genera
Tortonian genera
Langhian genera
Serravallian genera
Miocene mammals of North America
Pliocene mammals of North America
Hemphillian
Blancan
Neogene Honduras
Neogene Mexico
Neogene Panama
Neogene United States
Fossils of Honduras
Fossils of Mexico
Fossils of Panama
Fossils of the United States
Fossil taxa described in 1977